Hochdorf Schönau railway station is a railway station in the municipality of Hochdorf, in the Swiss canton of Lucerne. It is an intermediate stop on the standard gauge Seetal line of Swiss Federal Railways.

Services 
The following services stop at Hochdorf Schönau:

References

External links 
 
 

Railway stations in the canton of Lucerne
Swiss Federal Railways stations